This is a list of the 2013 Championship 1 season results. Championship 1 is the third-tier rugby league competition in the United Kingdom. The 2013 season starts on 29 March (Good Friday) and ends on 29 September with the Grand Final at Leigh Sports Village in Leigh, Greater Manchester, which replaces the previous venue of the Halliwell Jones Stadium in Warrington. It is the first season in the Rugby Football League for three teams, Hemel Stags, Oxford Rugby League and University of Gloucestershire All Golds.

The 2013 season consists of two stages. The regular season was played over 18 round-robin fixtures, in which each of the nine teams involved in the competition played each other once at home and once away. This means that teams will play 16 games and will have two bye-rounds, where they will not play a game. In the Championship 1, a win was worth three points in the table, a draw worth two points apiece, and a loss by less than 12 points during the game earned one bonus point. Defeats by more than 12 points yielded no points.

At the end of the regular season, the team finishing first in the table will be crowned Championship and will be promoted to the Championship. The teams who finish the regular season between second and sixth will enter the play-offs with the winner claiming the second promotion place.

Regular season

Round 1

Round 2

Round 3

Round 4

Round 5

Round 6

Round 7

Round 8

Round 9

Round 10

Round 11

Round 12

Round 13

Round 14

Round 15

Round 16

Round 17

Round 18

Play-offs
The play-offs will commence following the conclusion of the regular season and include the teams who finished second to fifth in the league and uses a 5 team play-off system, culminating in the grand final at Leigh Sports Village in Leigh, home of Championship sides Leigh Centurions and Swinton Lions.

Week 1

Week 2

Week 3

Week 4

Play-off ladder

Notes
A. Match moved from Gateshead International Stadium to Filtrona Park, South Shields 
B. Match re-arranged 14 July due to Gloucestershire All Golds having ineligible doctor on original date of game 
C. Match moved from Prince of Wales Stadium, Cheltenham to Regentsholme, Lydney

References

External links
Official Championship 1 website

Championship 1
2013 in Welsh rugby league
RFL League 1